is a private university in Otsu, Shiga, Japan. The predecessor of the school was founded in 1920. It was chartered as a junior women's college in 1950 and became coeducational in 1993.

External links
 Official website 

Educational institutions established in 1920
Private universities and colleges in Japan
Universities and colleges in Shiga Prefecture
Buildings and structures in Ōtsu
1920 establishments in Japan